Kreusa (minor planet designation: 488 Kreusa) is a C-type asteroid orbiting the Sun in the asteroid belt, with the type indicating a surface with a low albedo and high carbonaceous content. The spectra of the asteroid displays evidence of aqueous alteration.

In 2002, Kreusa was detected by radar from the Arecibo Observatory at a distance of 1.67 AU.

References

External links
 
 

Background asteroids
Kreusa
Kreusa
Kreusa
C-type asteroids (Tholen)
19020626